Michael O'Neill received a doctorate in education from Harvard University in 1967.

He is one of the pioneers in non-profit management education and founded the Institute for Nonprofit Organization Management at the University of San Francisco.

Published works
Books and monographs

(with Dennis R. Young) Educating Managers of Nonprofit Organizations. New York: Praeger, 1988.
The Third America: The Emergence of the Nonprofit Sector in the United States. San Francisco: Jossey-Bass, 1989.
Ethics in Nonprofit Management: A Collection of Cases. San Francisco: Institute for Nonprofit Organization Management, University of San Francisco, 1990.
(with Herman E. Gallegos) Hispanics and the Nonprofit Sector. New York: Foundation Center, 1991.
(with Teresa Odendahl) Women and Power in the Nonprofit Sector. San Francisco: Jossey-Bass, 1994.
(with Kathleen Fletcher) Nonprofit Management Education: U.S. and World Perspectives. New York: Praeger, 1998.
(with William L. Roberts) Giving and Volunteering in California. San Francisco: Institute for Nonprofit Organization Management, University of San Francisco, 2000.
Nonprofit Nation: A New Look at the Third America. San Francisco: Jossey-Bass, 2002.

Articles, chapters, reviews

"Responsible Management in the Nonprofit Sector." In Virginia A. Hodgkinson, Richard W. Lyman, and Associates, The Future of the Nonprofit Sector: Challenges, Changes, and Policy Considerations, pp. 261-274. San Francisco: Jossey-Bass, 1989.
"An Interview with Harold M. Williams." Nonprofit Management and Leadership, Vol. 1, No. 1 (Fall 1990), 69-74.
"Ethical Dimensions of Nonprofit Administration." Nonprofit Management and Leadership, Vol. 3, No. 2 (Winter 1992), 199-213. Also in Terry L. Cooper (ed.), Handbook of Administrative Ethics (New York: Marcel Dekker, 1994), pp. 475-484.
"Fundraising as an Ethical Act." Advancing Philanthropy, Vol. 1, No. 1 (Fall 1993), 30-35. Also in Marianne G. Briscoe (ed.), Ethics in Fundraising: Putting Values into Practice, New Directions for Philanthropic Fundraising, No. 6, Winter 1994 (San Francisco: Jossey-Bass, 1994), pp. 3-13.
"Philanthropic Dimensions of Mutual Benefit Organizations." Nonprofit and Voluntary Sector Quarterly, Vol. 23, No. 1 (Spring 1994), 3-20.
"An Interview with Robert L. Payton." Nonprofit Management and Leadership, Vol. 5, No. 3 (Spring 1995), 303-309.
"The Ethical Dimensions of Fund Raising." In Dwight F. Burlingame (ed.), Critical Issues in Fund Raising, pp. 58-64. New York: John Wiley and Sons, 1997.
(with Richard J. Orend and Connie S. Mitchell) "State Nonprofit Databases: Lessons from the California Experience." Nonprofit Management and Leadership, Vol. 7, No. 4 (Summer 1997), 447-454.
"A Spare Literature," Advancing Philanthropy, Vol. 5, No. 2 (Summer 1997), 26-30.
"An Interview with Susan Berresford." Nonprofit Management and Leadership, Vol. 8, No. 3 (Spring 1998), 287-292.
"Masters of Nonprofit Management." In Jay M. Shafritz (ed.), International Encyclopedia of Public Policy and Administration. Volume 3, pp. 1368-1371. Boulder, Col.: Westview, 1998.
"Mutual Benefit Organization." In Jay M. Shafritz (ed.), International Encyclopedia of Public Policy and Administration. Volume 3, pp. 1466-1470. Boulder, Col.: Westview, 1998.
"Religious Nonprofits in California." In Mark Chaves and Sharon L. Miller (eds.), Financing American Religion. Walnut Creek, Ca.: Alta Mira Press, 1999, pp. 131-137.
(with Peter D. Hall, Diane Viokur-Kaplan, Dennis R. Young, and Frederick S. Lane) "Where You Stand Depends on Where You Sit: The Implications of Organizational Location for University-Based Programs in Nonprofit Management." Public Performance and Management Review, Vol. 25, No. 1 (September 2001), 74-87.
"Research on Giving and Volunteering: Methodological Considerations." Nonprofit and Voluntary Sector Quarterly, Vol. 30, No. 3 (September 2001), 505-514.
"Administrative Ethics in Nonprofit Organizations." In Terry L. Cooper (ed.), Handbook of Administrative Ethics. 2 edition. (New York: Marcel Dekker, 2001), pp. 623-628.
"International Trends in University-Based Nonprofit Management Education." In Zhao LiQing and Carolyn Iyoya Irving (eds.), The Non-Profit Sector and Development. Hong Kong: Hong Kong Press for Social Sciences, 2001.
"Ethics and Philanthropy." In Dwight F. Burlingame (ed.), Philanthropy in America: A Comprehensive Historical Encyclopedia. Santa Barbara, Ca.: ABC-CLIO, 2004, vol. 1, pp. 140-143.
"Mutual Benefit Organizations." In Dwight F. Burlingame (ed.), Philanthropy in America: A Comprehensive Historical Encyclopedia. Santa Barbara, Ca.: ABC-CLIO, 2004, vol. 2, pp. 324-329.
"Developmental Contexts of Nonprofit Management Education." Nonprofit Management and Leadership, Vol. 16, No. 1 (Fall 2005), 5-17.
Review of Nonprofit Organizations: Theory, Management, Policy by Helmut K. Anheier. Nonprofit and Voluntary Sector Quarterly, Vol. 35, No. 3 (September 2006), 543-545.
Review of On Being Nonprofit: A Conceptual and Policy Primer by Peter Frumkin. Nonprofit Management and Leadership, Vol. 17, No. 3 (Spring 2007), 375-376.
"The Future of Nonprofit Management Education." Nonprofit and Voluntary Sector Quarterly, Supplement to Vol. 36, No. 4 (December 2007), 169S-176S.
"The Removal of Chief Justice Maginnis: Politics and the Judiciary in Wyoming Territory." Annals of Wyoming, Vol. 79, Nos. 3-4 (Summer-Autumn 2007), 50-72.

See also
Ethics of philanthropy

External links
Michael O'Neill Biography on USF Faculty Page

Year of birth missing (living people)
Living people
Harvard Graduate School of Education alumni
University of San Francisco faculty